The 1973 Ohio Bobcats football team was an American football team that represented Ohio University in the Mid-American Conference (MAC) during the 1973 NCAA Division I football season. In their 16th season under head coach Bill Hess, the Bobcats compiled a 5–5 record (2–3 against MAC opponents), finished in a tie for third place in the MAC, and were outscored by all opponents by a combined total of 231 to 156.  They played their home games in Peden Stadium in Athens, Ohio.

Schedule

References

Ohio
Ohio Bobcats football seasons
Ohio Bobcats football